Air Murder  is a 2022 South Korean drama film written and directed by Jo Yong-sun. The film, based on novel Gyun by So Ji-won, which deals with the humidifier disinfectant disaster that actually happened in Korea, was released on April 22, 2022.

Synopsis 
The setting of Air Murder is based on the PHMG-caused lung disease outbreak in South Korea and the struggle to uncover the cause of the disease in the Republic of Korea.

Cast 
 Kim Sang-kyung as Jung Tae-hoon
 A doctor who loses his wife to an unknown lung disease and even puts his son at risk.
 Lee Sun-bin as Han Young-joo
 Gil-joo's younger sister, a prosecutor at the Seoul District Prosecutors' Office who becomes a lawyer after the death of her sister.
 Yoon Kyung-ho as Seo Woo-shik
 Manager at manufacturer company of humidifier disinfectant.
 Seo Young-hee Han Gil-joo
 Tae-hoon's wife.
 Kim Jung-tae as Hyeon-jong
 An owner of a car center who lost his entire family in an instant due to an unknown lung disease.
 Lee Yoo-jun as Yang Gye-jang
 Young-joo's colleague at the Seoul District Prosecutors' Office. 
 Jo Seo-hoo as Eun-jeong
 Jang Gwang
 Song Young-gyu
 Sung Byung-suk
 Jang Hyuk-jin
 Lee Ji-hoon as In-ho 
 A doctor who is Jeong Tae-hoon's junior.

Production 
Script reading was held on September 29, 2020, and filming began on October 9, 2020.

Notes

References

External links
 
 
 

2022 films
2022 drama films
2020s Korean-language films
South Korean films based on actual events
South Korean courtroom films
South Korean drama films
Films about diseases
Films about lawyers
Films about physicians
Films based on South Korean novels
Films set in 2011